Jack Carmody (7 June 1911 – 28 March 1982) was an Australian rules footballer who played with Collingwood and Hawthorn in the Victorian Football League (VFL).

Carmody was member of Collingwood's back-to-back premierships in 1935 and 1936. He was used mostly on the wing and during the late 1930s often found himself on the sidelines due to the strength of the Collingwood side. As a result, he crossed to Hawthorn in 1940 where he played some games up forward and captained the club in 1942.

Honours and achievements
Collingwood
 2× VFL premiership player: 1935, 1936

Individual
 Hawthorn captain: 1942
 Hawthorn life member

References

External links

1911 births
Collingwood Football Club players
Collingwood Football Club Premiership players
Hawthorn Football Club players
Australian rules footballers from Melbourne
1982 deaths
Two-time VFL/AFL Premiership players
People from Richmond, Victoria